The United Nations Regional Groups are the geopolitical regional groups of member states of the United Nations. Originally, the UN member states were unofficially organized into five groups as an informal means of sharing the distribution of posts for General Assembly committees. Now this grouping has taken on a much more expansive and official role. Many UN bodies are allocated on the basis of geographical representation. Top leadership positions, including Secretary-General and President of the General Assembly, are rotated among the regional groups. The groups also coordinate substantive policy and form common fronts for negotiations and bloc voting.

History

League of Nations 
The precedent of the geographic distribution of seats was set by the United Nations' predecessor, the League of Nations. Under the League's system, a Nominations Committee was created in order to create election slates for distribution of seats in the Council of the League.

This proved a difficult task as the number of seats on the Council was constantly changing. However, from 1926 to 1933 an unofficial pattern of distribution emerged where the non-permanent seats on the Council were distributed along the following lines:
 3 for Latin American states
 1 for a Scandinavian state
 1 for a Little Entente state (Czechoslovakia, Romania or Yugoslavia)
 1 for a member of the British Commonwealth
 1 for a Far Eastern state
 1 seat each for Spain and Poland

United Nations 
During the drafting of the United Nations Charter, the idea of geographic distribution of seats of the new organisation's bodies was one of the priorities of the drafters. On the United States' recommendation, the very first General Committee of the United Nations was composed of:
 The five permanent members of the Security Council
 3 Latin American states 
 2 British Commonwealth states
 2 Eastern European states
 1 Western European state
 1 Middle Eastern state

This distribution began the precedent of using regional groups for the allocation of seats in United Nations bodies. For example, the first election to the Security Council used a similar scheme, allocating seats along the following lines:
 The five permanent members of the Security Council
 2 Latin American states
 1 British Commonwealth state
 1 Eastern European state
 1 Western European states
 1 Middle Eastern state

Elections to the Economic and Social Council also followed along similar lines, but instead allocated seats to "Near East states" and not "Middle Eastern states."

However, these arrangements were not formal and were based on "Gentlemen’s Agreements" agreed upon by the United States and the Soviet Union regarding the distribution of seats in United Nations bodies.

Reform 
Following a wave of decolonization, there were multiple admissions into the United Nations from African, Asian and Pacific states. After the Bandung Conference in 1955, there was increasing solidarity among post-colonial states which led to pressure being put on the United Nations for increased representation of these states. This pressure led to the passage of Resolution 1192 (XII) of 12 December 1957, which established a formal pattern for distribution of seats on the General Committee.

This was followed on 17 December 1963 by Resolutions 1990 (XVIII) and 1991 (XVIII). These resolutions further outlined the distribution of seats on the General Committee, but also outlined how seats would be geographically distributed on the Economic and Social and Security Councils. The resolutions outlined the regions as follow:
 African and Asian states
 Latin American states
 Eastern European states
 Western Europe and Other states

On  20 December 1971 Resolution 2847 (XXVI) formally set up the present distribution system that is in place for the Economic and Social Council. It also split the African and Asian states region into two separate regions, one for Asia and one for Africa.

Finally, on 19 December 1978 Resolution 33/138 was passed by the General Assembly. This resolution called for equitable geographic distribution of the presidency and vice-presidencies of the General Assembly, as well as of the chairmanship of the seven main committees.

Present 
The most recent change to the regional grouping system was in 2011, when the Asia Group was renamed the Group of Asia and the Pacific Small Island Developing States, also Asia and the Pacific Group or Asia-Pacific Group, in order to recognise the growing role Pacific island nations play in the United Nations System.

As of 2019, Kiribati is the only United Nations Member State that has never joined one of the regional groups.

Overview
Apart from allowing member states with related international interests to liaise, discuss and coordinate their voting and other activities at the United Nations, the main function of the regional groups is to distribute membership quotas in United Nations bodies and leadership positions. According to convention, the non-permanent membership seats of the United Nations Security Council is apportioned between regional groups according to a set formula. Other bodies, such as the United Nations Economic and Social Council and the United Nations Human Rights Council, also have set membership quotas for each regional group. The position of the President of the United Nations General Assembly rotates amongst the groups on a ten-year cycle (the current rule being that each regional group fills the position twice during the cycle, in effect it rotates on a five-year cycle).

Seating allocations

The regional groups

African Group

The African Group consists of 54 member states (28% of all UN members), and is thus the largest regional group by number of member states. It is the only regional group that has a territory that coincides with the traditional continent of which its name originates. Its territory is composed entirely of land from Africa.

The African Group has three seats on the Security Council, all non-permanent. The group also has 14 seats on the Economic and Social Council and 13 seats on the Human Rights Council. In the rotation for the election of the President of the United Nations General Assembly, the group is responsible for electing nationals from its member states in years ending with 4 and 9; most recently, Tijjani Muhammad-Bande of Nigeria was elected to this position in 2019.

Member states of the African Group are as follows:

Asia and the Pacific Group

The Group of Asia and the Pacific Small Island Developing States (formerly the Asia Group), or Asia and the Pacific Group, consists of 53 member states (27% of all UN members) and is the second largest regional group by number of member states after the African Group. Its territory is composed of much of the continents of Asia and Oceania with the exception of a few countries.

Armenia, Azerbaijan, Georgia, and Russia are members of the Eastern European Group, while Australia, New Zealand and Israel are members of the Western European and Others Group. Cyprus is the only European Union member state which is a member of the Asia and the Pacific Group. Additionally, Turkey participates in meetings of the Asia and the Pacific Group, but is for the purpose of elections considered part of the Western European and Others Group.

The Asia and the Pacific Group has three seats on the Security Council: China's permanent seat and two non-permanent seats. The group also has 11 seats on the Economic and Social Council and 13 seats on the Human Rights Council. In the rotation for the election of the President of the United Nations General Assembly, the group is responsible for electing nationals from its member states in years ending with 1 and 6; most recently, Abdulla Shahid of Maldives was elected to this position in 2021.

Member states of the Asia and the Pacific Group are as follows:

Eastern European Group

The Eastern European Group consists of 23 member states (12% of all UN members), and as such is the regional group with the fewest member states. Its territory is composed of land from Eastern Europe, as well as parts of Central Europe and Southeast Europe.

The Eastern European Group has two seats on the Security Council: Russia's permanent seat and one non-permanent seat. The group also has 6 seats on the Economic and Social Council and 6 seats on the Human Rights Council. In the rotation for the election of the President of the United Nations General Assembly, the group is responsible for electing nationals from its member states in years ending with 2 and 7; most recently, Csaba Kőrösi of Hungary was elected to this position in 2022.

Member states of the Eastern European Group are as follows:

Latin American and Caribbean Group (GRULAC)

The Latin American and Caribbean Group, or GRULAC, consists of 33 member states (17% of all UN members). Its territory is composed of entirely of land from South and Central America, as well as some islands in the Caribbean and Mexico in North America. Any differences arise from the presence of dependent territories of European countries.

The Latin American and Caribbean Group has two seats on the Security Council, both non-permanent. The group also has 10 seats on the Economic and Social Council and 8 seats on the Human Rights Council. In the rotation for the election of the President of the United Nations General Assembly, the group is responsible for electing nationals from its member states in years ending with 3 and 8; most recently, María Fernanda Espinosa of Ecuador was elected to this position in 2018.

Member states of the Latin American and Caribbean Group are as follows:

Western European and Others Group (WEOG)

The Western European and Others Group, or WEOG, consists of 28 member states (15% of all UN members). Its territory is composed of land dispersed on all of the continents, but mostly centered in Western Europe and Northern America. Additionally, the United States acts as an observer, as it is not formally part of any regional group.

Including the United States, the Western European and Others Group has five seats on the Security Council: three permanent seats (France, the United Kingdom, and the United States) and two non-permanent seats. The group also has 13 seats on the Economic and Social Council and 7 seats on the Human Rights Council. In the rotation for the election of the President of the United Nations General Assembly, the group is responsible for electing nationals from its member states in years ending with 0 and 5; most recently, Volkan Bozkır of Turkey was elected to this position in 2020.

Member states of the Western European and Others Group are as follows:

Observers
The following states participate in the Western European and Others Group as observers only:

Special cases

Cyprus
Cyprus, an EU member state, is neither a member of WEOG or the Eastern European Group. Due to its geographical location and close ties with Russia, Cyprus decided to remain neutral between the two European Groups and thus is a member of the Asia and the Pacific Group.

Holy See
The Holy See participates in the Western European and Others Group as an observer only.

Israel

Israel is geographically in Asia, but it became a temporary member of the Western European and Others Group in 2000. It became a permanent member in 2014.

Kiribati
As of 2010, Kiribati (geographically in Oceania) has never been elected to be a member of any regional group, despite other Oceania nations belonging to the Asia and the Pacific Group.  Until 2017, despite its membership in the United Nations, Kiribati had never delegated a permanent representative. In September 2017, Teburoro Tito became the country's first permanent representative.

Palestine
The Palestine Liberation Organization has participated in the Asia and the Pacific group since 2 April 1986 as an observer.

Turkey
Turkey participates fully in both WEOG and Asia and the Pacific Group, but for electoral purposes is considered a member of WEOG only.

United States
The United States of America voluntarily chooses not to be a member of any group, and attends meetings of the Western European and Others Group as an observer only. However, it is considered to be a member of WEOG for putting forward candidates for electoral purposes in the United Nations General Assembly.

Calls for reform 
The great variation in size (from 21 to 53) between the regional groups is problematic in that it may mean equal representation is more difficult to achieve. Additionally, some of the groups might be in need of reform due to political changes within the group. Many members of the Eastern European Group have, in recent years, gradually aligned themselves with the Western European and Others Group due to their admission into the North Atlantic Treaty Organization and the European Union. Additionally, some members of the Western European and Others Group also feel disenfranchised due to increased coordination between European Union states that are in the group.

In 1995, the Australian Government proposed that the regional groups be reorganised in seven groups as follows:
 Western Europe (24 members)
 Central and Eastern Europe (22 members)
 Middle East and the Maghreb (19 members)
 Africa (43 members)
 Central Asia and the Indian Ocean (17 members)
 East Asia and Oceania (25 members)
 America (35 members)
This proposal would create a homogenous Middle Eastern group, as well as meet the demands of South Pacific states who have called for their own region.

In 1997, a Canadian study proposed that the regional groups be reorganised into nine groups as follows:
 Eurasia (21 members)
 Asia/Pacific (25 members)
 Mediterranean/Gulf (19 members) 
 Northern Europe (20 members) 
 Southern Europe (19 members) 
 North Africa (23 members) 
 Southern Africa (23 members)
 Americas (19 members) 
 Caribbean (16 members)
This proposal would create groups of similar size, while also factoring in the local politics of the regions.

In 2000, the government of Nauru, in its general debate address, called for a new regional group for Oceania. This new group would give more representation to Pacific island nations, who are at present grouped together with the Middle East, Central Asia and East Asia, limiting their opportunities. Aside from Nauru, this proposed bloc may also include Australia and New Zealand (both in the WEOG), Japan, South Korea, the ASEAN countries, and the rest of Oceania.

Gallery

See also
 IAEA Areas
 List of members of the United Nations Security Council
 List of members of the United Nations Economic and Social Council
 List of members of the United Nations Commission on Human Rights
 United Nations geoscheme
 Continental union

References

External links
UNAIDS, The Governance Handbook, January 2010 (pp. 28,29); PDF document at UN-AIDS website.

United Nations-related lists
History of the United Nations
United Nations coalitions and unofficial groups